Sacred Heart High School may refer to:

Canada
Sacred Heart High School (Ottawa), Ontario
Sacred Heart Catholic High School (Newmarket), Newmarket, Ontario
Sacred Heart Catholic High School (Walkerton), Walkerton, Ontario
Sacred Heart High School (Yorkton), Saskatchewan

India
Sacred Heart Boys High School, Mumbai
Sacred Heart High School (Changanacherry), Changanassery
Sacred Heart High School (Sidhpur), Dharamshala
Sacred Heart School, Golaghat
Sacred Heart High School (Hyderabad), a school in Hyderabad
Sacred Heart High School, Vashi, Navi Mumbai
Sacred Heart High School, Nala Sopara, Mumbai

Pakistan
 Sacred Heart High School for Boys, Lahore
 Sacred Heart High School for Girls, Lahore

United Kingdom
Sacred Heart Language College, England
Sacred Heart High School (London), England
Sacred Heart Catholic School, Camberwell
Sacred Heart Catholic High School (Newcastle upon Tyne)
Sacred Heart Catholic College or Sacred Heart Catholic High School, Crosby, Merseyside

United States
Sacred Heart High School (California), Los Angeles, California
Sacred Heart High School (Connecticut), Waterbury, Connecticut
Sacred Heart High School (Kansas), Salina, Kansas
Sacred Heart Academy (Louisville), Kentucky
Sacred Heart High School (Ville Platte, Louisiana)
Sacred Heart High School (Kingston, Massachusetts)
Sacred Heart High School (Roseville, Michigan)
Sacred Heart High School (East Grand Forks, Minnesota)
Sacred Heart High School (Hattiesburg, Mississippi)
Sacred Heart High School (Missouri), Sedalia, Missouri
Sacred Heart High School (Nebraska), Falls City, Nebraska
Sacred Heart High School (New Jersey), Vineland, New Jersey
Sacred Heart High School (Yonkers, New York)
Sacred Heart High School (Pennsylvania), Carbondale, Pennsylvania
Sacred Heart High School (Hallettsville, Texas)
Sacred Heart of Jesus High School, Jackson, Tennessee
Sacred Heart Catholic School (Muenster, Texas)

See also
Sacred Heart (disambiguation)
Sacred Heart College (disambiguation)
Sacred Heart school (disambiguation)